
Tianbao may refer to:

Sanggyai Yexe (1917–2008), also known as Tian Bao, Tibetan official of the People's Republic of China

Places in China

Towns
Tianbao, Fujian (天宝), in Zhangzhou, Fujian
Tianbao, Shandong (天宝), in Xintai, Shandong
Tianbao, Daying County (天保), in Daying County, Sichuan
Tianbao, Yunnan (天保), in Malipo County, Yunnan

Townships
Tianbao Township, Hubei (天宝乡), in Zhuxi County, Hubei
Tianbao Township, Jiangxi (天宝乡), in Yifeng County, Jiangxi
Tianbao Township, Xuanhan County (天宝乡), in Xuanhan County, Sichuan
Tianbao Township, Anyue County (天宝乡), in Anyue County, Sichuan

Historical eras
Tianbao (天保, 550–559), era name used by Emperor Wenxuan of Northern Qi
Tianbao (天保, 562–585), era name used by Emperor Ming of Western Liang
Tianbao (天寶, 742–756), era name used by Emperor Xuanzong of Tang
Tianbao (天寶, 908–912), era name used by Qian Liu, king of Wuyue